The 2021 Canterbury-Bankstown Bulldogs season was the 87th in the club's history. They were competing in the National Rugby League's 2021 Telstra Premiership, under head coach Trent Barrett who had his first season in charge of the team.

Fixtures

Regular season

Ladder

2021 squad

Awards

Canterbury-Bankstown Bulldogs Awards Night
Due to the COVID-19 pandemic in New South Wales, the club was unable to hold a formal awards night, but awarded the following awards via social media.

 Dr George Peponis Player of the Year: Josh Jackson 
 Coaches Award: Jake Averillo 
 Steve Mortimer Rookie of the Year: Bailey Biondi-Odo 
 Peter Warren Medal (Community Service): Raymond Faitala-Mariner 
 Les Johns Clubperson of the Year: Adrian Low

References

Canterbury-Bankstown Bulldogs seasons
Canterbury-Bankstown Bulldogs